The Best Remixes is an EP released by Cyndi Lauper in 1989 on Epic/CBS Records, and re-released in 1996 on Epic/Sony Records. It was released exclusively in Japan and compiles six remixes of her top selling singles. It came in a regular jewel case with Japanese lyrics printed inside and peaked at 61 on the Japanese charts.

Track listing 
 "Girls Just Want to Have Fun" (extended version) - 6:08
 "She Bop" (Special Dance Mix) - 6:27
 "Good Enough" (Dance Remix) - 5:27
 "Change of Heart" (extended version) - 7:55
 "What's Going On?" (club version) - 6:33
 "Money Changes Everything" (extended live version) - 6:25

Charts

Certifications

Release history

References

Best Remixes, The
Best Remixes, The
1989 remix albums
Epic Records remix albums
Epic Records EPs